A draughtsman (British spelling) or draftsman (American spelling) may refer to:

 An architectural drafter, who produced architectural drawings until the late 20th century
 An artist who produces drawings that rival or surpass their other types of artwork
 A drafter who prepares technical drawings
 A law costs draftsman who settles the costs of legal fees
 A parliamentary draftsman who prepares legislation 
 A playing piece in the game of draughts